Bicton, Shropshire may refer to:
Bicton, Shrewsbury
Bicton, South Shropshire